The following are the national records in track cycling in Mexico maintained by Mexico's national cycling federation: Federación Mexicana de Ciclismo.

Men

Women

References

External links
 Federación Mexicana de Ciclismo web site

Mexico
Records
Track cycling
track cycling